The I Gran Premio dell'Autodromo di Monza was a motor race for Formula One cars held at Monza on 17 October 1948. Alfa Romeo dominated the event, the latest development of the 158 taking the first three places with Jean-Pierre Wimille winning from pole position. Carlo Felice Trossi and Consalvo Sanesi were second and third, Sanesi having set fastest lap. Piero Taruffi completed the rout in one of the older 158s.

Result

References

Monza Grand Prix
Grand Prix
Monza Grand Prix